José Rodríguez Fuster (born August 1946 in Villa Clara, Cuba) is a Cuban naïve artist specializing in ceramics, painting, drawing, engraving, and graphic design.

Career
From 1963 he studied at the Escuela Nacional de Instructores de Arte in Havana. As a professional, he was commissary of several exhibitions and was a member of the Cuban Association of artist and craftsmen (ACAA).

Individual exhibitions

Fuster did several solo exhibitions of his work, including Acuarelas y dibujos. Alegría de vivir  in 1967, which traveled to several galleries in Havana. Drawings and ceramics was shown in 1976 at the Opera Theater Hall in Bucharest, Romania. In 1994 he presented Acuarelas y Cerámicas de Fúster at the Galería Espacio Abierto, Revista Revolución y Cultura, Havana. He presented Oil Paintings by Fúster in 1998 in Lyon, France. In 2007 his works were exhibited at The colours of life in The North Wall Gallery, Oxford, England and in 2008 at La Galleria, Pall Mall, London where he presented his ceramics and paintings in 'The colours of Cuba'.

Collective exhibitions
Fuster has participated also in many group shows. In 1966 he was selected for Arte Popular, a show presented by ENIA (the National School of Art Instructors), at the Centro de Arte Internacional, Havana. In 1975 the exhibit Cerámicas Cubanas was seen at the Museo de Artes Decorativas, Havana. His work was part of Graphics, Photographs, Books and Handcrafts from Cuba, seen in New Delhi, India. In 1997 he was in the Feria Internacional de Artesanía. FIART '97. PABEXPO in Havana.

Community work

Fuster has made a major contribution over 10 years of work of rebuilding and decorating the fishing town of Jaimanitas in the outskirts of Havana, where he lives.  Jaimanitas is now a unique work of public art where Fuster has decorated over  80 houses with ornate murals and domes to suit the personality of his neighbours, he has built a chess park with giant boards and tables, The Artists’ Wall composed of a quilt of dozens of tiles signed and donated by other Cuban artists, a theatre and public swimming pools.

Nowadays, Fuster’s art is a cherished part of Cuban culture and joins the rank of other public artworks such as that of Gaudi in Barcelona or that of Brâncuși in the Romanian city of Targu Jiu. He sponsors this project by the sale of his paintings and ceramics.

Awards
In 1974 Fuster won a prize in ceramics at the IV Salón Nacional Juvenil de Artes Plásticas, held at the Museo Nacional de Bellas Artes de La Habana.

Collections
His pieces can be found in collections at the Center for Cuban Studies, New York; the Museo de la Cerámica, Castillo de la Real Fuerza, Havana; and the Museo Nacional de Bellas Artes de La Habana.

References
 Jose Veigas-Zamora, Cristina Vives Gutierrez, Adolfo V. Nodal, Valia Garzon, Dannys Montes de Oca. Memoria: Cuban Art of the 20th Century. California/International Arts Foundation, 2001. 
 Jose Viegas. Memoria: Artes Visuales Cubanas Del Siglo Xx. California International Arts, 2004

External links
 Fuster
 Online UK Fuster Gallery Soy Cuba
 "Artist finds plenty of room in Castro's Cuba"
 "Fuster in Facebook"
 "Cuban Artist José Fuster Profiled by Reuters"
 "Cuba's answer to Gaudí by The Guardian"
 José Rodríguez Fuster : "Picasso of the Caribbean" brings color to "Fusterlandia" - By Havana-Cultura

Cuban contemporary artists
Living people
1946 births